Alfred J. Hilbe (22 July 1928 – 31 October 2011) was a political figure from Liechtenstein.

Hilbe was the Deputy Prime Minister of Liechtenstein from 1965 to 1970, and the Prime Minister from 1970 to 1974.  He was born in Gmunden.

See also

 Politics of Liechtenstein

Notes

1928 births
2011 deaths
Place of death missing
Heads of government of Liechtenstein
Deputy Prime Ministers of Liechtenstein
Patriotic Union (Liechtenstein) politicians